This article is a catalog of actresses and models who have appeared on the cover of Harper's Bazaar Chile, the Chilean edition of Harper's Bazaar magazine, starting with the magazine's first issue in April 2015.

2015

2016

2017

2018

2019

External links
 
 Harper's Bazaar Chile on Models.com

Chile